Nannapaneni Venkat College of Engineering and Technology is a private engineering college in Tenali of the Indian state of Andhra Pradesh. It was established in 2009 as NVR College and affiliated to Jawaharlal Nehru Technological University, Kakinada and approved by All India Council for Technical Education. Bhaskar Nannapaneni is the chairman of the college.

History 

The college began with  the establishment of VSR & NVR college in 1950, founded by Late Nannapaneni Venkat Rao.

Academics 
The college offers undergraduate engineering courses such as Computer Science and Engineering, Electronics and communication engineering, Electrical and electronic engineering, Civil engineering and Mechanical engineering.

References 

Educational institutions established in 2009
Engineering colleges in Andhra Pradesh
Education in Tenali
2009 establishments in Andhra Pradesh